HMS Winchester was an Admiralty W-class destroyer of the Royal Navy. She saw service in the First and Second World Wars.

History
Winchester was ordered by J. Samuel White and Company, Cowes, on the Isle of Wight as part of the 1916–1917 fleet program 10 order. Her keel was laid on 12 June 1917 and she was launched on 1 February 1918. The ship was completed on 29 April 1918.

Completed towards the end of the First World War, Winchester went on to be part of operations against the Bolsheviks in the Baltic Sea. After the Second World War the ship was placed on the reserve list, and was sold in March 1946. The ship was scrapped in Inverkeithing.

In 1936, under the command of Captain W.N.T. Beckett RN, HMS Winchester fulfilled King George V's dying wish for his beloved racing yacht HMY Britannia to follow him to the grave. Her hull was towed out to St Catherine's Deep near the Isle of Wight, and she was sunk by HMS Winchester.

Bibliography

External links

 

V and W-class destroyers of the Royal Navy
1918 ships
World War I destroyers of the United Kingdom
World War II destroyers of the United Kingdom
Ships built on the Isle of Wight